The Foreign Service of Pakistan is part of the Central Superior Services of Pakistan. It was formally created in October 1952, after having been an improvised organization since the creation and independence of Pakistan in 1947. Its old name was Foreign Service of India working within the Indian Civil Service (British India) before 1947. After 1947, its recruitment and hiring of employees is done through the larger organization Civil Service of Pakistan. Chaudhry Sir Muhammad Zafarullah Khan (Urdu: محمد ظفر اللہ خان‎; 6 February 1893 – 1 September 1985) was a Pakistani jurist and diplomat who served as the first Foreign Minister of Pakistan. After serving as foreign minister he continued his international career and is the only Pakistani to preside over the International Court of Justice. He also served as the President of the UN General Assembly. He is the only person to date to serve as the President of both UN General Assembly and the International Court of Justice.

History

Foreign Service of Pakistan was constituted on an ad hoc basis immediately on the birth of Pakistan. The Service was first given an executive fiat in a decision of the Federal Cabinet in July 1948. A formal resolution constituting the service was announced in October 1952. It envisaged diplomatic posts in the Ministry of Foreign Affairs and in the Diplomatic and consular missions of Pakistan abroad. The resolution provided for the posts of (a) Secretary (1), (b) Joint Secretaries (2), (c) Deputy Secretaries (8), and (d) Under Secretaries (16). Posts for Pakistan Diplomatic Missions abroad provided for Ambassadors (17), High Commissioners (5), Ministers (4), Commissioners (1), Deputy High Commissioners (2), Counselors (15), First Secretaries (10), Second Secretaries (19), Third Secretaries (31), Consul General (3), Consul (4), and Vice Consul (7).

Between 1952 and 1960, the cadre strength was constantly kept under review and was enlarged by executive orders in view of the expanding requirements. However, shortage of personnel continued to plague the service. The total strength of the officers gradually increased both at the Headquarters and the Missions. In 1972, the total strength of the officers at the Headquarters and the Missions grew to 323. At present there are 403 officers both at the Headquarters and in our Missions.

The entry into the former Foreign Service of Pakistan through examination began in 1948. The Recruitment to the Officers cadre (Foreign Service of Pakistan) is through the competitive examination conducted annually by the Federal Public Service Commission (FPSC) of Pakistan. Foreign Service of Pakistan is among the top three groups along with Pakistan Administrative Service and Police Service of Pakistan. The Establishment Division in consultation with the Ministry of Foreign Affairs announces annually the number of vacancies of officers in the Foreign Affairs Group, which vary from year to year. Officers of the Foreign Service of Pakistan undergo common training at the Civil Services Academy, Lahore and later are given six months specialized training at the Foreign Service Academy, Islamabad. The officers also undergo language learning trainings at various prestigious universities/institutions abroad to learn different languages including Arabic, French, German, Chinese, Spanish, Korean, Portuguese, Russian, Japanese etc. Fully funded Language scholarships offered by other countries are also availed. The Ministry thus has a rich reservoir of officers who are well versed in different languages. Foreign Service of Pakistan is a cadre that runs the Ministry of Foreign Affairs (Pakistan) as well as Pakistan's Embassies/High Commissions/Consulates in other countries of the world.

Ranks
After the initial training period, junior officers join the Ministry of Foreign Affairs, Islamabad and serve in the political, administrative or protocol wings. Or rather begin their diplomatic careers abroad. Rise in ranks at headquarters and missions are:

Headquarters:
Assistant Director BPS-17

Deputy Director BPS-18

Director BPS-19

Director General BPS-20

Additional/Special Secretary BPS-21

Secretary (head of Deptt.) BPS-22
 
Missions Abroad:
Third Secretary/Vice Consul BS-17

Second Secretary/Consul  BS-18

First Secretary/Deputy Consul General BS-19

Consul General/Ambassador/High Commissioner Trivial Areas BS-20

Ambassador/High Commissioner Important Areas BS-21

Note: Consul Generals and other envoys toward low political profile missions and are lower by virtue of rank as well and can be compared with DGs. Ambassadors and High Commissioners toward high profile nations however rank higher and are Special Secretaries; equivalent of administrative Additional Secretaries in national headquarters.

Envoy of one Commonwealth country to another is termed High Commissioner.

Progress of women as diplomats
As a result of Administrative Reforms of 1972'' under Zulfiqar Ali Bhutto regime, Foreign Service of Pakistan was opened even much more to women in Pakistan after 1973.

Here are some of the distinguished women diplomats:
 Begum Rana Liaquat Ali Khan (Ambassador to Netherlands) ( 1954 – 1961)
 Hina Rabbani Khar (Served as the top diplomat in Foreign Service of Pakistan, Foreign Minister of Pakistan (2011 – 2013)
 Sherry Rehman (Ambassador to the United States (2011 – 2013)
 Tehmina Janjua (First Woman Foreign Secretary) (February 2017 to April 2019)
 Maleeha Lodhi (Ambassador to the United Nations (2015 – 2019)

See also
 Civil Service of Pakistan or a more formal name is Central Superior Services for the same organisation 
 Federal Public Service Commission of Pakistan
 Ministry of Foreign Affairs (Pakistan)

References

External links
Ministry of Foreign Affairs, Government of Pakistan - official website

Pakistan
Foreign relations of Pakistan
Pakistan, Foreign Service
Civil service of Pakistan
Pakistan federal departments and agencies
Pakistan